London Films Productions is a British film and television production company founded in 1932 by Alexander Korda and from 1936 based at Denham Film Studios in Buckinghamshire, near London. The company's productions included The Private Life of Henry VIII (1933), Things to Come (1936), Rembrandt (1936), and The Four Feathers (1939). The facility at Denham was taken over in 1939 by Rank and merged with Pinewood to form D & P Studios. The outbreak of war necessitated that  The Thief of Bagdad (1940) be completed in California, although Korda's handful of American-made films still displayed Big Ben as their opening corporate logo.

After a restructuring of Korda's UK operations in the late 1940s, London Films were made at Shepperton. One of these was The Third Man (1949). The company's film The Sound Barrier (1952) won the Academy Award for Best Sound.

More than 40 years after Korda died in January 1956, the company returned to active film-making in 1997 with Morgan Mason as the chief executive.

Filmography

1930s 
la dame de chez Maxim's (1933)Strange Evidence (1933)Counsel's Opinion  (1933)Wedding Rehearsal  (1933)Men of Tomorrow  (1933)Cash  (1933)The Private Life of Henry VIII  (1933)The Girl from Maxim's  (1933)Catherine the Great  (1934)The Private Life of the Gannets  (1934, documentary short)The Private Life of Don Juan  (1934)The Scarlet Pimpernel  (1934)Sanders of the River  (1935)Moscow Nights  (1935)The Ghost Goes West  (1935)Things to Come  (1936)Rembrandt  (1936)Men Are Not Gods  (1936)The Man Who Could Work Miracles  (1936)Forget Me Not  (1936)Fox Hunt (1936)Conquest of the Air (1936)A Romance in Flanders  (1937)Fire Over England  (1937)Dark Journey  (1937)Storm in a Teacup  (1937)Elephant Boy  (1937)Farewell Again  (1937)Knight Without Armour  (1937)Action for Slander  (1937)Return of the Scarlet Pimpernel  (1937)I, Claudius  (1937)  –  project abandonedThe Squeaker  (1937)Paradise for Two  (1937)The Divorce of Lady X  (1938)South Riding  (1938)The Drum  (1938)The Challenge  (1938)Prison Without Bars  (1938)Q Planes  (1939)The Four Feathers  (1939)Over the Moon  (1939)The Lion Has Wings  (1939)The Spy in Black  (1939)

 1940s 21 Days  (1940)The Thief of Bagdad  (1940)Perfect Strangers  (1945)An Ideal Husband  (1947)Mine Own Executioner  (1947)The Winslow Boy  (1948)Anna Karenina  (1948)The Fallen Idol  (1948)Bonnie Prince Charlie  (1948)The Small Back Room (1949)That Dangerous Age  (1949)The Last Days of Dolwyn  (1949)Saints and Sinners  (1949)The Third Man  (1949)

 1950s The Elusive Pimpernel  (1950)The Cure for Love  (1950)The Happiest Days of Your Life  (1950)The Angel with the Trumpet  (1950)Bridge of Time  (1950)State Secret (1950)My Daughter Joy  (1950)Seven Days to Noon  (1950)Gone to Earth (1950; US: The Wild Heart, 1952)The Wooden Horse  (1950)The Long Dark Hall (1951)The Wonder Kid  (1951)The Tales of Hoffmann (1951)Lady Godiva Rides Again  (1951)Mr. Denning Drives North (1951)Outcast of the Islands  (1952)Cry, the Beloved Country (1952)The Sound Barrier  (1952)
 Home at Seven (1952)The Ringer  (1952)The Holly and the Ivy  (1952)The Story of Gilbert and Sullivan  (1953)The Captain's Paradise  (1953)Twice Upon a Time  (1953)The Heart of the Matter  (1953)The Iron Petticoat  (1953)The Man Between  (1953)Hobson's Choice  (1954)Aunt Clara  (1954)The Belles of St. Trinian's (1954)Raising a Riot  (1955)The Man Who Loved Redheads  (1955)Richard III  (1955)The Constant Husband  (1955)Summertime  (1955)A Kid for Two Farthings  (1955)The Deep Blue Sea  (1955)Storm Over the Nile   (1955)Smiley  (1956)

1970sPoldark (BBC TV, 1975–1977)

1980sThe Scarlet Pimpernel (1982)The Country Girls (1984)Kim (1984)

1990sThe Best of Friends (1991)The Time Game (1992)Big Ideas (1992)An Ungentlemanly Act (1992)The Scarlet Pimpernel (TV series, 1999)

 Alexander Korda Films Inc. (USA) 
 1930s The Drum  (1938)

 1940s That Hamilton Woman  (1941)Lydia  (1941)Jungle Book''  (1942)

References

Mass media companies established in 1932
Film production companies of the United Kingdom
1932 establishments in England